Suiattle  may refer to:

 The Suiattle River, a river in Snohomish and Skagit Counties, Washington
 The Suiattle Valley
 The Suiattle River Road
 The Sauk–Suiattle Indian Tribe, an Indian tribe of Skagit and Snohomish counties
 The Sauk–Suiattle Indian Reservation
 The Suiattle Glacier